Agylla maasseni is a moth of the family Erebidae. It was described by Paul Dognin in 1894. It is found in Panama, Colombia, Venezuela and Ecuador.

References

Moths described in 1894
maasseni
Moths of Central America
Moths of South America